Old Malden is a ward of the Royal Borough of Kingston upon Thames in south London,  south west of Charing Cross.

Malden Manor is an alternative name for part of Old Malden, popularised by the railway company that made up this name for its station here.

History 
The area has a long history as the ancient parish of Malden, derived from the Old English mæl duna, meaning 'the cross on the hill'.

Malden appears in Domesday Book of 1086 as Meldone, held partly by William de Wateville and partly by Robert de Wateville. Its domesday assets were: 4 hides and 3 virgates; 1 chapel, 1 mill worth 12s, 6½ ploughs,  of meadow, woodland worth 1 hog out of 7 hogs. It rendered £7 12s 0d.

St John the Baptist Church, close to the Hogsmill, is a Grade II listed building. The medieval church was built by Walter de Merton, Bishop  of Rochester. It comprised nave, chancel and west tower. The flint south and east walls of the chancel survive. In 1611 the chancel's old flint walls were repaired and the nave and the tower rebuilt in brick. The church was restored in 1863 by T G Jackson. In 1875 a new nave and chancel were added, and in 2004 a two-storey extension was completed.

The Grade II listed Manor House, next to St John's, is also mentioned in the Domesday Book; in 1264 Walter de Merton, Bishop of Rochester, founded a college here that was later moved to Oxford as Merton College. The house was later used as a court in the reign of Henry VIII, and in the mid 18th century the house was the home of Captain Cook. In 1852 the Hogsmill River was the setting for the background of Ophelia painted by John Everett Millais.

Malden became Old Malden in 1870, with the development of New Malden, two miles (3 km) to the north in the parish of Kingston upon Thames.

Geography

At the heart of Old Malden is Plough Green, a traditional village green, surrounded by:
 The Plough, a 15th-century public house, containing a Miller & Cooper restaurant;
 a small parade of shops, which includes the Plough Bakery, Persian, Japanese and Italian restaurants, a hairdresser, a barber, a dentist and two convenience stores
 Plough Pond

Plough Green is used in the summer to hold two fetes; one for St John the Baptist Church and the other for the local Scouts.

To the west of Plough Green is Old Malden Library.

The Parish Church of Old Malden is St John the Baptist, and can be found just beyond the width restriction in Church Road. There was a church building here at the time of the Domesday Book. The present building comprises the 1611 re-build, the 1875 extension and another extension added in 2004. The Vicar is the Revd Michael Roper who was inducted to the benefice in 2019.

Old Malden is served by Malden Manor station to the north and Worcester Park station to the south, both 25 minutes from Waterloo. Malden Road, joining the green and Worcester Park station, was flanked by two rows of over forty mature poplar trees until 2010, when most were felled as a safety measure due to internal rotting. Replacement oaks were planted later that year. 
A minor tributary of the River Thames, the Hogsmill, flows through the west of Old Malden.

Nearby places

Conservation Area 
Old Malden Conservation Area was created in March 1971, designating the area as being "of special architectural or historic interest the character or appearance of which it is desirable to preserve or enhance". (Planning (Listed Buildings and Conservation Areas) Act 1990, Section 69). It contains two distinct parts, St Johns’ and Plough Green, whose special character is summarised in the designation as:

St Johns’: A medieval village centre above the Hogsmill River, containing the Saxon Church of St. John the Baptist, the site of its vicarage, the 18th century Manor House and ancient fields.

Plough Green: A village green with a pond, a 15th-century public house, and a picturesque group of mainly 19th century cottages. The public house is currently operated as a steak house.

Notable residents
 Ian Hutchinson, Chelsea footballer, lived in 'The Glebe' during the 1970s
 Daley Thompson, British double-Olympic champion decathlete, lived near The Plough
 William Gush, portrait painter
 Thomas Ravis, Church of England clergyman and academic
 Guy Chambers, songwriter

In addition, Millais' created the background of Ophelia in Old Malden at the Hogsmill River

Education

Notable open spaces close by
 Wimbledon Common
 Richmond Park
 Bushy Park
 Nonsuch Park

Notes

External links
Statistics from 2001 Census 
Maldens and Coombe neighbourhood 
Photographs of the Conservation Area
Parish Church website

Areas of London
Districts of the Royal Borough of Kingston upon Thames